This article serves as an index - as complete as possible - of all the honorific orders or similar decorations received by the Bhutanese royal family, classified by continent, awarding country and recipient.

Kingdom of Bhutan
 King Jigme Khesar Namgyel :
 Grand Master of the Order of the Dragon King (07/11/2008). 
 Grand Master of the Order of Great Victory of the Thunder Dragon (14/12/2006).
 Grand Master of the Royal Order of Bhutan (14/12/2006).
 Grand Master of the Order of the Wheel of the Thunder Dragon (01/2008).
 Grand Master of the National Order of Merit (07/11/2008).
 Grand Master of the Order of the Beloved Son of the Dragon (07/11/2008).
 Commemorative Silver Jubilee Medal of King Jigme Singye (02/06/1999).
 The Royal Red Scarf (25/06/2002).
 The Royal Saffron Scarf (14/12/2006).
 60th Birthday Badge Medal of King Jigme Singye (11/11/2015).
 Queen Ashi Jetsun Pema : 60th Birthday Badge Medal of King Jigme Singye (11/11/2015).
 King Father Jigme Singye :
 Former Grand Master of the Royal Order of Bhutan (24/07/1972).
 Former Grand Master of the Order of Great Victory of the Thunder Dragon (29/09/1985).
 The Royal Saffron Scarf (24/07/1972).
 King Jigme Khesar Investiture Medal (06/11/2008).
 Centenary of the Monarchy Commemorative Medal (06/11/2008).
 Queen Mother Ashi Dorji Wangmo :
 Commemorative Silver Jubilee Medal of King Jigme Singye (02/06/1999).
 King Jigme Khesar Investiture Medal (06/11/2008).
 Centenary of the Monarchy Commemorative Medal (06/11/2008).
 60th Birthday Badge Medal of King Jigme Singye (11/11/2015).
 Princess Ashi Sonam Dechen :
 Commemorative Silver Jubilee Medal of King Jigme Singye (02/06/1999).
 King Jigme Khesar Investiture Medal (06/11/2008).
 Centenary of the Monarchy Commemorative Medal (06/11/2008).
 60th Birthday Badge Medal of King Jigme Singye (11/11/2015).
 Prince Dasho Jigyel Ugyen :
 Commemorative Silver Jubilee Medal of King Jigme Singye (02/06/1999).
 The Royal Red Scarf (28/08/2007).
 King Jigme Khesar Investiture Medal (06/11/2008).
 Centenary of the Monarchy Commemorative Medal (06/11/2008).
 60th Birthday Badge Medal of King Jigme Singye (11/11/2015).
 Queen Mother Ashi Tshering Pem :
 Commemorative Silver Jubilee Medal of King Jigme Singye (02/06/1999).
 King Jigme Khesar Investiture Medal (06/11/2008).
 Centenary of the Monarchy Commemorative Medal (06/11/2008).
 60th Birthday Badge Medal of King Jigme Singye (11/11/2015).
 Princess Ashi Chimi Yangzom :
 Commemorative Silver Jubilee Medal of King Jigme Singye (02/06/1999).
 King Jigme Khesar Investiture Medal (06/11/2008).
 Centenary of the Monarchy Commemorative Medal (06/11/2008).
 60th Birthday Badge Medal of King Jigme Singye (11/11/2015).
 Princess Ashi Kesang Choden :
 Commemorative Silver Jubilee Medal of King Jigme Singye (02/06/1999).
 King Jigme Khesar Investiture Medal (06/11/2008).
 Centenary of the Monarchy Commemorative Medal (06/11/2008).
 60th Birthday Badge Medal of King Jigme Singye (11/11/2015).
 Prince Dasho Ugyen Jigme :
 Commemorative Silver Jubilee Medal of King Jigme Singye (02/06/1999).
 King Jigme Khesar Investiture Medal (06/11/2008).
 Centenary of the Monarchy Commemorative Medal (06/11/2008).
 60th Birthday Badge Medal of King Jigme Singye (11/11/2015).
 The Royal Red Scarf (17/12/2021).
 Queen Mother Ashi Tshering Yangdon :
 Commemorative Silver Jubilee Medal of King Jigme Singye (02/06/1999).
 King Jigme Khesar Investiture Medal (06/11/2008).
 Centenary of the Monarchy Commemorative Medal (06/11/2008).
 60th Birthday Badge Medal of King Jigme Singye (11/11/2015).
 Princess Ashi Dechen Yangzom :
 Commemorative Silver Jubilee Medal of King Jigme Singye (02/06/1999).
 King Jigme Khesar Investiture Medal (06/11/2008).
 Centenary of the Monarchy Commemorative Medal (06/11/2008).
 60th Birthday Badge Medal of King Jigme Singye (11/11/2015).
 Prince Gyaltshab Jigme Dorji :
 Commemorative Silver Jubilee Medal of King Jigme Singye (02/06/1999).
 King Jigme Khesar Investiture Medal (06/11/2008).
 Centenary of the Monarchy Commemorative Medal (06/11/2008).
 60th Birthday Badge Medal of King Jigme Singye (11/11/2015).
 Queen Mother Ashi Sangay Choden :
 Commemorative Silver Jubilee Medal of King Jigme Singye (02/06/1999).
 King Jigme Khesar Investiture Medal (06/11/2008).
 Centenary of the Monarchy Commemorative Medal (06/11/2008).
 60th Birthday Badge Medal of King Jigme Singye (11/11/2015).
 Prince Dasho Khamsum Singye :
 Commemorative Silver Jubilee Medal of King Jigme Singye (02/06/1999).
 King Jigme Khesar Investiture Medal (06/11/2008).
 Centenary of the Monarchy Commemorative Medal (06/11/2008).
 60th Birthday Badge Medal of King Jigme Singye (11/11/2015).
 Princess Ashi Euphelma Choden :
 Commemorative Silver Jubilee Medal of King Jigme Singye (02/06/1999).
 King Jigme Khesar Investiture Medal (06/11/2008).
 Centenary of the Monarchy Commemorative Medal (06/11/2008).
 60th Birthday Badge Medal of King Jigme Singye (11/11/2015).
 Queen Grandmother Ashi Kesang Choden :
 King Jigme Singye Investiture Medal (02/06/1974).
 Commemorative Silver Jubilee Medal of King Jigme Singye (02/06/1999).
 King Jigme Khesar Investiture Medal (06/11/2008).
 Centenary of the Monarchy Commemorative Medal (06/11/2008).
 Order of the Dragon King, First Class (16/11/2008).
 60th Birthday Badge Medal of King Jigme Singye (11/11/2015).

Europe

Kingdom of Sweden
 King Father Jigme Singye : Knight of the Royal Order of the Seraphim (1994).

America

United States of America
 Queen Mother Ashi Dorji Wangmo : Caritas in Veritate International: Pope Francis Award for Charity and Leadership (22 October 2016).
 Queen Mother Ashi Sangay Choden : United Nations Population Award (Individual Category, 10 December 2020).

Asia

Kingdom of Bahrain 
 King Father Jigme Singye : Order of Khalifa, 1st Class (1990).

State of Japan
 King Father Jigme Singye : Collar of the Supreme Order of the Chrysanthemum (16/03/1987).

State of Kuwait
 King Father Jigme Singye : Collar of the Order of Mubarak the Great (1990).

Kingdom of Nepal
 King Father Jigme Singye : Member of the Most Glorious Order of the Benevolent Ruler (05/10/1988).

Oceania

Kingdom of Tonga
 King Jigme Khesar Namgyel : Knight Grand Cross of the Most Illustrious Order of Queen Sālote Tupou III (14/05/2010).
 Princess Ashi Sonam Dechen :
 King George Tupou V Coronation Medal (01/08/2008).
 Knight Grand Cross with Collar of the Royal Order of the Crown of Tonga (01/08/2008).

References 

Orders, decorations, and medals of Bhutan
Bhutan